Alexander Robert "Sandy" Nairne  (born 8 June 1953) is an English historian and curator. From 2002 until February 2015 he was the director of the National Portrait Gallery, London.

Life and career
Nairne is the son of senior civil servant Sir Patrick Nairne, attended Radley College and studied at University College, Oxford in the early 1970s and rowed for the Oxford University second crew Isis.

Nairne came into contact with Nicholas Serota, while working at the Museum of Modern Art, Oxford in 1974–76.

After a period as an Assistant Curator at the Tate Gallery (1976–80) - during which he additionally worked on international curation projects such as the Irish biennial EVA International - Nairne was appointed Director of Exhibitions at the Institute of Contemporary Arts (ICA), a position he held until 1984 - exhibitions included "Brand New York," Robert Mapplethorpe, Mary Miss, "Women's Images of Men," and "About Time."

In 1987, Nairne wrote the television documentary series "State of the Art" for Channel 4. The series and Nairne's accompanying book acts as a follow on to the Robert Hughes series The Shock of the New and provides a critical survey of contemporary visual arts from America and Europe through the 1980s.

In 1988, Nairne was appointed as the director of the Visual Arts Department at the Arts Council. In this capacity, Nairne oversaw the re-invigoration of the British Art Show, the establishing of the Institute of International Visual Arts (InIVA) as a permanent organisation to promote culturally diverse projects, the furtherance of Percent for Art and the creation of the Curating Contemporary Art Course at the Royal College of Art.

In 1996, Nairne co-edited with Reesa Greenberg and Bruce W. Ferguson the book Thinking about Exhibitions (1996), a review of international practice in contemporary art exhibitions.

Nairne became Director of Programmes for the Tate Gallery under Nicholas Serota. In this capacity, Nairne was responsible for the restructuring of the Tate's collection administration in preparation for the opening of Tate Modern and the redevelopment of the original Tate Gallery in Millbank as Tate Britain.

Nairne was responsible for the successful recovery of two late J.M.W. Turner paintings, stolen in Germany in 1994, and put back on display at Tate Britain in early 2003. He negotiated secretly for 8 years on behalf of the Tate to get the two paintings back. His experience is chronicled in his 2011 book, Art Theft and the Case of the Stolen Turners.

Nairne became Director of the National Portrait Gallery in London in 2002. On 12 June 2014 he announced his resignation which took effect in early 2015. He was succeeded by Nicholas Cullinan.

He was appointed Commander of the Order of the British Empire (CBE) in the 2011 Birthday Honours for services to the arts.

Nairne was among those appointed on 29 January 2015 to the Bank of England's Banknote Character Advisory Committee, whose first task would be to decide who should appear on the next £20 banknote.

Personal life
Nairne's wife is the art historian Lisa Tickner, with whom he has a son, the lighting designer Christopher Nairne, and a daughter, the curator and art historian Eleanor Nairne. His brother, Andrew Nairne, is Director of Kettle's Yard Gallery, Cambridge. His other brother, James Nairne, Andrew's twin, is head of Art at Cranleigh School, Surrey.

References

External links

1953 births
Living people
People educated at Radley College
Alumni of University College, Oxford
English curators
English male non-fiction writers
English book editors
Directors of the National Portrait Gallery, London
People associated with the Tate galleries
Commanders of the Order of the British Empire
Fellows of the Society of Antiquaries of London
20th-century English historians
21st-century English historians